Philip Kumar Maini  (born 16 October 1959 in Magherafelt, Northern Ireland) is a Northern Irish mathematician. Since 1998, he has been the Professor of Mathematical Biology at the University of Oxford and is the director of the Wolfson Centre for Mathematical Biology in the Mathematical Institute.

Education
Maini was educated at Rainey Endowed School in County Londonderry and Balliol College, Oxford where he was awarded a BA in 1982 and a DPhil in 1985, the latter for a thesis modelling morphogenetic pattern formation supervised by James D. Murray

Research and career
After a postdoctoral research position at Oxford and an associate professorship at the University of Utah, he returned to Oxford in 1990 as a lecturer. He became director of the Wolfson Centre for Mathematical Biology in 1998, then Statutory Professor in Mathematical Biology and professorial fellow of St John's College, Oxford in 2005.

Maini's research includes mathematical modelling of tumours, wound healing and embryonic pattern formation, and the theoretical analysis of these models. His research has been funded by the Engineering and Physical Sciences Research Council (EPSRC) and Biotechnology and Biological Sciences Research Council (BBSRC). He has supervised 53 PhD students.

From 2002 to 2015 Maini was the editor-in-chief of the Bulletin of Mathematical Biology and has served on the editorial boards of many other journals. Maini gave an invited talk at ICM 2010 in Hyderabad, speaking on "Modelling Aspects of Tumour Metabolism."

Awards and honours
Maini was elected a Fellow of the Royal Society (FRS) in 2015. His certificate of election reads: 

Maini was an elected member of the boards of the Society for Mathematical Biology and the European Society for Mathematical and Theoretical Biology. He is a Fellow of the Institute of Mathematics and its Applications (IMA), the Society for Industrial and Applied Mathematics (SIAM), and the Royal Society of Biology, and is a corresponding member of the Mexican Academy of Sciences. He has held visiting positions at universities worldwide. In 2017, he was elected to a fellowship of the Academy of Medical Sciences and the next year elected a Foreign Fellow by the Indian National Science Academy. In 2021, he was elected Fellow of the European Academy of Sciences and a Fellow of the American Association for the Advancement of Science.

Maini co-authored a 1997 Bellman Prize-winning paper and received a Royal Society Leverhulme Trust Senior Research Fellowship and Wolfson Research Merit Award, and the London Mathematical Society Naylor Prize.

References

External links 
 Official web site

1959 births
Living people
People from Magherafelt
People educated at Rainey Endowed School
Alumni of Balliol College, Oxford
University of Utah faculty
Fellows of St John's College, Oxford
Mathematicians from Northern Ireland
Theoretical biologists
Fellows of the Society for Industrial and Applied Mathematics
Fellows of the Royal Society
Foreign Fellows of the Indian National Science Academy